Anna Tomaszewicz-Dobrska (1854–1918) was the second Polish woman to become a doctor, and the first female Polish doctor to practice in Poland. She obtained her medical degree in 1877 in Zurich.

During her fifth year of study in Zurich she worked as an assistant to Professor Edward Hitzig (a German neurologist and psychiatrist) in the Institute for the Mentally Ill.

After obtaining her medical degree she worked in Berlin and Vienna for a short time. However, she was not allowed to pass the state exam, which would have given her the right to practice medicine in Poland, and she was refused as a member of the Polish Society of Medicine because she was a woman.

She moved to St. Petersburg and passed the state exam there. This allowed her to practice women's health and pediatric medicine within the Polish Kingdom and Russia. In 1882 an epidemic of infection during childbirth broke out in Warsaw, and a few maternity shelters were opened; shelter number 2 (on Prosta Street) was given to Anna to lead, and she led it until 1911. In 1896 she became the first to perform a Caesarean section in Warsaw.

She was also one of the founders of the Society of Polish Culture.

Further reading
Anna Tomaszewicz Dobrska: A Leaf from Polish Medical History by Zbigniew Filar. (Warsaw: Polish Society of the History of Medicine, 1959).

References

Polish women physicians
Polish pediatricians
1854 births
1918 deaths
19th-century Polish physicians
20th-century Polish physicians
20th-century women physicians
19th-century women physicians
20th-century Polish women